Mirella Avalle (27 May 1922 – 5 September 2012) was an Italian sprinter. She competed in the women's 4 × 100 metres relay at the 1948 Summer Olympics.

Avalle died in Villanuova sul Clisi on 5 September 2012, at the age of 90.

References

External links
 

1922 births
2012 deaths
Athletes (track and field) at the 1948 Summer Olympics
Italian female sprinters
Olympic athletes of Italy
Olympic female sprinters
20th-century Italian women
21st-century Italian women